Polichno is a village and municipality in Slovakia.

Polichno may also refer to:
Polichno, Kuyavian-Pomeranian Voivodeship (north-central Poland)
Polichno, Piotrków County in Łódź Voivodeship (central Poland)
Polichno, Radomsko County in Łódź Voivodeship (central Poland)
Polichno, Kielce County in Świętokrzyskie Voivodeship (south-central Poland)
Polichno, Pińczów County in Świętokrzyskie Voivodeship (south-central Poland)
Polichno, Greater Poland Voivodeship (west-central Poland)
Polichno, Pomeranian Voivodeship (north Poland)